NGC 770 is an elliptical galaxy in the constellation Aries. NGC 770 is gravitationally linked to NGC 772. The galaxy was discovered on November 3, 1855 by RJ Mitchell.

References

External links
 

770
Elliptical galaxies
Aries (constellation)
007517